The men's javelin throw event at the 1965 Summer Universiade was held at the People's Stadium in Budapest on 26 August 1965.

Medalists

Results

Qualification
Qualification mark: 65.00 metres

Final

References

Athletics at the 1965 Summer Universiade
1965